Ricardo Rojas may refer to:
 Ricardo Rojas (archer), Mexican archer
 Ricardo Rojas (writer), Argentine writer
 Ricardo Rojas (footballer, born 1971) Paraguayan football defender
 Ricardo Rojas (footballer, born 1974), Chilean football player
 Ricardo Rojas Frías, Cuban boxer
 Doctor Ricardo Rojas, a town in Chubut Province, Argentina